Rulyrana flavopunctata is a species of frog in the family Centrolenidae. It is found on the eastern slopes of the Cordillera Oriental in Colombia (Casanare, Boyacá, Caquetá, and Meta Departments) and on the eastern slopes of the Andes in Ecuador. Common name yellow-spotted Cochran frog has been coined for it.

Etymology
The specific name flavopunctata is derived from the Latin flavus (=golden) and punctatus (=dotted), and refers to the dorsal coloration of this species.

Description
Adult males measure  and females  in snout–vent length. The snout is short and round. The eyes are relatively large. The tympanum is visible. Both fingers and toes are webbed. The dorsum is shagreened in texture and pale green in color, with numerous minute yellow flecks. The edge of the upper lip is pale yellow The fingers and toes are yellow whereas the chest is white.

Habitat and conservation
It is usually found along streams. Breeding takes place in permanent streams.

Rulyrana flavopunctata  is a common forest species, although it can locally be threatened by habitat destruction and pollution. It is known from several protected areas.

References

flavopunctata
Amphibians of Colombia
Amphibians of Ecuador
Amphibians described in 1973
Taxa named by William Edward Duellman
Taxa named by John Douglas Lynch
Taxonomy articles created by Polbot